Lost Creek is a stream in Newton County, Missouri and Ottawa County, Oklahoma. It is a tributary to the Spring River.

The stream flows to the west-northwest and turns to the southwest as it passes south of the community of Racine. The stream continues to the southwest passing through Seneca, Missouri and enters eastern Oklahoma. The stream flows southwest parallel to U.S. Route 60. The stream enters the Spring River within the waters of the Grand Lake of the Cherokees just west of Wyandotte.

The name Lost Creek was given by early settlers due to the difficulty they had locating the stream based on earlier descriptions of the stream and the area.

References

Rivers of Newton County, Missouri
Rivers of Missouri
Rivers of Oklahoma